Sequoyah High School is a public high school in Madisonville, Tennessee. The school, a part of Monroe County Schools, was built in 1995 and combined Vonore High School and Madisonville High School. It is named after the Cherokee Indian Sequoyah. It serves grades 9-12 and is one of three high schools in Monroe County.

The school is accredited by the Southern Association of Colleges and Schools. Sequoyah High School is recognized as a Bronze School by U.S. News & World Report. The mascot is the Chief and the school colors are red, white, and gold.

Administration & faculty
Ms. Debi Tipton is the current principal of Sequoyah High School. The assistant principals are Ms. Kristie Tallent and Mr. Terry Harris along with Mr. Randy Echols who serves as freshman academy principal. 
Sequoyah High School has a teaching staff of 60 as well as support staff of about 20.

Academics and testing

The percentage of students who come from socioeconomically disadvantaged homes is 52.85%.

Sequoyah offers extracurricular activities which include Associated Student Body, 25+ school clubs, and various special interest organizations.
Volunteer hours are not required for graduation, but students are encouraged to do volunteer work.
A partial list of organizations includes: Academic Incentive Club, Art Club, Beta Club, Color Guard,
Chief's Club, Class Government, Drama, Envirothon, Ethics Bowl, FCA, FCCLA, FFA, FLC, FTA/Peer Tutoring, Future Business
Leaders of America, GSA, HOSA, Journalism, Key Club, Music (marching band and concert choir), Planet Club, SACS, Scholar's
Bowl, Science Bowl, Science Fair, Science Honor Society, Science Olympiad, Sequoyah Cares, SQHS government, Student
Council, Talent Search, VICA, and Yearbook.
Sequoyah also has many competitive athletic teams. A few of these teams include football, basketball, marching band, cheerleading, and baseball, as well as many others.

Overall School Performance
The State of Tennessee Report Card for 2019 scores the school as follows. Scores can range from 0-4, with 4 being the highest.

 Academic Achievement: 2.7
 Student Academic Growth: 3.7
 Chronically Out of School: 4.0
 Ready to Graduate: 2.6
 Graduation Rate: 2.8

References

Public high schools in Tennessee
Schools in Monroe County, Tennessee